Joseph Kossonogi (1908–1981) (also Yosef Kossonogy) was an Israeli painter.

Biography

Joseph Kossonogi was born in Budapest, Hungary in 1908. After studies at the Berlin Academy of Art and advanced studies in France, the Netherlands, Italy and Spain, he immigrated to Mandate Palestine and settled in Tel Aviv in 1926. There he formed the collective of young painters known as Massad.

In 1929, the Massad group had its first exhibition, and, in 1935, the group's members joined the Israel Association of Painters and Sculptors. Kossonogi had one-man shows at the Tel Aviv Museum of Art in 1944 and 1954, in which years he was a co-recipient of the Dizengoff Prize in painting. In 1956, Kossonogi joined the Artists' Colony in Safed. In 1958, the former president of France Vincent Auriol began collecting his work. Kossonogi won the Histadrut Prize in 1966 and the Nordau Prize in 1976. He settled in Safed in 1956 and died in 1981.

Colour figures strongly in Kossonogi's oeuvre. He was preoccupied with the bright sun of Eretz Israel and its effect on the lands, crops, and lives of Jewish settlers and native Arabs. Israeli art critic Gideon Ofrat writes of the artist's oeuvre: "Kossonogi launched his career with romantic watercolours rich in brown and green staining; subsequently, under the influence of Raoul Dufy, they grew lighter and focused on the poetical effects of transparency and fluidity." Kossonogi's focus on light and colour was likely inherited from the European influences that marked his formative period, notably Henri Matisse and André Derain. Along with important Israeli watercolourists Mordechai Avniel and Shimshon Holzman, Kossonogi was considered a master of the aquarelle medium.

Selected exhibitions
 2004: University of Haifa Art Gallery, Haifa: Our Landscape: Notes on Landscape Painting in Israel (online catalogue)
 1944: Tel-Aviv Museum of Art

Selected collections
 Israel Museum, Jerusalem

See also
Visual arts in Israel

References

Further reading
 Ayal, Avishay, and Yoram Bar-Gal. Our Landscape: Notes on Landscape Painting in Israel [exhibition catalogue]. Haifa: University of Haifa Art Gallery, 2004.
 Lask, I.M. (ed.). Joseph Kossonogi: Landscapes of Israel [portfolio of colour plates]. Tel-Aviv: Y. Tsitsik, [195?].
 Ofrat, Gideon. One Hundred Years of Art in Israel. Boulder: Westview Press, 1998.

External links
 Israeli Art Centre (Israel Museum, Jerusalem - Yosef Kossonogi)
 Smithsonian Libraries Art & Artists Files (Joseph Kossonogi)

Hungarian Jews
Hungarian emigrants to Mandatory Palestine
Jews in Mandatory Palestine
20th-century Israeli Jews
Jewish painters
1908 births
1981 deaths
Prussian Academy of Arts alumni
20th-century Israeli painters